Sir John William Evans, CMG (1 December 1855 – 2 October 1943) was an Australian politician, a member of the Tasmanian House of Assembly and Premier of Tasmania from 11 July 1904 to 19 June 1909.

Early life and nautical career
Evans was born in 1855 in Liverpool, England, but migrated with his family to Battery Point, Tasmania when he was four years old. After education in Hobart, Evans embarked on a year-long voyage through Asian ports with his parents. His father, a merchant seaman, arranged an apprenticeship for him on his part-owned barque, Helen, trading to China and Japan.

Political career
John Evans was first elected to the Tasmanian House of Assembly in the electorate of Kingborough on 20 January 1897. He did not have a political party, at this time, but is described as Anti-Socialist. Evans became Premier on 12 July 1904, holding office until 19 June 1909. In 1909 his seat of Kingborough was abolished and replaced with the Division of Franklin. He won the seat back in 1909 and continued to serve in parliament until 1937 as Commonwealth Liberal and Nationalist. His time in parliament, forty years from 1897 to 1937, makes him the longest-serving member in Tasmania.

References

1855 births
1943 deaths
Premiers of Tasmania
Members of the Tasmanian House of Assembly
Australian Knights Bachelor
Australian Companions of the Order of St Michael and St George
British emigrants to Australia
Australian people of Welsh descent
Politicians from Liverpool
Speakers of the Tasmanian House of Assembly
Leaders of the Opposition in Tasmania
Treasurers of Tasmania